Mark Kounnas (born 1969) is an Australian actor and television presenter. Mark has had many acting roles on television and films and is probably best known for his role in Mad Max Beyond Thunderdome as Gekko. He has also been a television presenter on an ABC children's television series with his sister and fellow actor Melissa Kounnas.

Mark has appeared on such television series as Chances, Water Rats, Heartbreak High, Butterfly Island, A Country Practice, Kings and the mini-series Bodyline. He also appeared in the 1982 Ginger Meggs movie as Raggsy.

Bibliography
 Holmstrom, John. The Moving Picture Boy: An International Encyclopaedia from 1895 to 1995. Norwich, Michael Russell, 1996, p. 376.

External links 

Australian male television actors
Australian male film actors
Australian people of Greek descent
Living people
1969 births